The 1938-39 Palestine League was the sixth season of league football in the British Mandate for Palestine. The defending champions were Maccabi Tel Aviv.

According to the Israel Football Association, Hapoel Tel Aviv won the title.  League matches were played from 5 February 1938 to 4 June 1938, completing the first half of the season before the summer break. However, as the Arab revolt intensified in fall 1938 and with the High commissioner issuing restrictive orders on travel throughout Palestine,  the EIFA created a two-tiered league for the Tel Aviv region, with matches played in the league counting towards the national league. The Tel Aviv League was completed on 14 January 1939 and in February 1939 a new league season began, with teams playing in regionalized divisions instead a national league.

League table

Tel Aviv League

References
RSSSF
100 Years of Football 1906-2006, Elisha Shohat (Israel), 2006

Palestine League seasons
Palestine
1938–39 in Mandatory Palestine football